Dimitar Sheytanov (born 15 March 1999) is a Bulgarian professional footballer who plays as a goalkeeper for Septemvri Sofia.

Professional career
Sheytanov started his career at early age at PAS Giannina, while his father played for the team, joining after this to the FC Obelya academy and eventually at Levski Sofia in 2014.
After a season long loan to Leeds United Academy, Sheytanov signed a professional contract with Aves in 2019. Sheytanov made his professional debut with Aves in a 4-0 Primeira Liga loss to S.L. Benfica on 21 July 2020. He left the club on 18 September, after the team didn't receive a license for LigaPro.

Personal life
Sheytanov is the son of the retired footballer Georgi Sheytanov.

References

External links
 
 Levski Sofia Profile
 RTP Profile

1999 births
Living people
Footballers from Sofia
Bulgarian footballers
Bulgaria youth international footballers
C.D. Aves players
OFC Pirin Blagoevgrad players
Primeira Liga players
Association football goalkeepers
Bulgarian expatriate footballers
Expatriate footballers in Portugal